Sinningia speciosa, sometimes known in the horticultural trade as gloxinia, is a tuberous member of the flowering plant native to Brazil within the family Gesneriaceae. Originally included in the genus Gloxinia in 1817, it was reclassified to Sinningia. Showy S. speciosa hybrids are still sometimes referred to simply as "gloxinia", although this name is now technically incorrect.

The name florist's gloxinia is now sometimes used to distinguish it from the rhizomatous species now included in the genus Gloxinia. Another common name is Brazilian gloxinia. The plants produce large, velvety, brightly colored flowers and are popular houseplants. Cultural requirements are similar to those of African violets except that S. speciosa generally requires more light and often has a dormant period, when the tuber should be kept cool and dry until it resprouts.

Cultivation
Although generally grown indoors, it is hardy in USDA hardiness zones 10-12.

References

speciosa
Flora of Brazil
House plants